Baptiste Ulens (born 24 July 1987) is a Belgian football player who plays for K.V. Kortrijk.

Career 
The right midfielder made one appearances in his early career in the Belgian First Division for R.A.E.C. Mons. He joined K.V. Kortrijk from WS Woluwe FC in January 2013

References 

1987 births
Living people
Belgian footballers
Association football midfielders
R.A.E.C. Mons players
R. Charleroi S.C. players
RWS Bruxelles players
K.V. Kortrijk players
Challenger Pro League players